is a Japanese baseball manga series by Mountain Pukuichi, serialized in Houbunsha's seinen manga magazine Manga Time Kirara Forward since April 2016. It has been collected in twelve tankōbon volumes. An anime television series adaptation by Studio A-Cat aired from April to June 2020.

Synopsis
Yomi Takeda just wanted to enjoy high school after her baseball match went downhill last year. Her baseball career which became the rumour, ended when she mistakenly believed that her magic pitch is the cause of the game loss, contrary to Yomi practicing her pitch a few years ago. To make matters worse, her previous pitcher won't allow her to use the magic pitch for the fear for making the game worse.

But by chance, twin's Yoshino, Ibuki and her childhood friend who is now a baseball catcher Tamaki decides to restore their high school, Shin Koshigaya's reputation after the scandal which causes the baseball club to be on hiatus. Two fielders in years one, a former kendo player, a power hitter and a baseball advisor came together to help push the team to be in the nationals as their motivation. Including two second years that already signed in to keep the club from being disbanded. Through training and compassion, everyone is helping each other overcome major difficulties as they deal with their mistakes and fears as they join in the National Baseball Tournament.

Characters

Media

Manga

Anime
An anime television series adaptation of Tamayomi was announced in the August issue of Manga Time Kirara Forward on June 24, 2019. The series was animated by Studio A-Cat and directed by Toshinori Fukushima, with Touko Machida handling series composition, Kōichi Kikuta designing the characters, Masahiko Matsuo designing the props and Visual Arts composing the music. It aired from April 1 to June 17, 2020 on AT-X, ABC, Nayoga TV, Tokyo MX, and KBC. The opening theme is "Never Let You Go" performed by Naho, while the ending theme is  performed by the cast of the Shin Koshigaya baseball team. Funimation has licensed the series for an English simulcast and an English dub.

Video games
Characters from the series appeared in collaboration with Akatsuki's mobile baseball game Cinderella Nine in 2020. Also, characters from the series appear alongside other Manga Time Kirara characters in the mobile RPG, Kirara Fantasia in 2020.

Stage
It was adapted into a stage performance for a week in June 2021. At Shinjukumura Theater LIVE, ten performances were scheduled beginning February 17, 2022.

Notes

References

External links
 

2020 anime television series debuts
Anime series based on manga
Baseball in anime and manga
Houbunsha manga
Seinen manga
Studio A-Cat
Funimation